Medieval Spanish literature consists of the corpus of literary works written in medieval Spanish between the beginning of the 13th and the end of the 15th century. Traditionally, the first and last works of this period are taken to be respectively the Cantar de Mio Cid, an epic poem whose manuscript dates from 1207, and La Celestina (1499), a work commonly described as transitional between the medieval period and the Renaissance.

By the end of the 10th century, the languages spoken in northern Spain had developed far from their Latin origins, and can assuredly be called Romance. Latin texts were no longer understood, as can be seen from the glosses used in manuscripts of Castile to explain Latin terms. 

Spanish oral literature was doubtless in existence before Spanish texts were written. This is shown by the fact that different authors in the second half of the 11th century could include, at the end of poems written in Arabic or Hebrew, closing verses that, in many cases, were examples of traditional lyric in a Romance language, namely Mozarabic. These final refrains are known as kharjas (jarchas in Spanish).

The kharjas texts 

The earliest recorded examples of a vernacular Romance-based literature date from the same time and location, the rich mix of Muslim, Jewish, and Christian cultures in Muslim Spain, in which Maimonides, Averroes, and others worked. The kharjas, dating from the 9th to the 12th centuries C.E., were short poems spoken in local colloquial Hispano-Romance dialects, known as Mozarabic, but written in Arabic script.  The kharjas appeared at the end of longer poetry written in Arabic or Hebrew known as muwashshah, which were lengthy glosses on the ideas expressed in the kharjas. Typically spoken in the voice of a woman, the kharjas express the anxieties of love, particularly of its loss, as in the following example:

This combination of Hispano-Romance expression with Arabic script, only discovered in 1948, locates the rise of a Spanish literary tradition in the cultural heterogeneity that characterized Medieval Spanish society and politics. However, the Mozarabic language of the kharjas appears to be a separate Romance language whose evolution from Vulgar Latin paralleled that of Castilian Spanish rather than deriving from or fusing into it. Hence, while the relatively recent discovery of the kharjas challenges the pride of chronological place that belonged for so long to the Poema del Cid (El Cantar de mio Cid) (1140 C.E.) in the history of Spanish literature, they cannot be seen as a precursor to Spain's great epic poem. What the discovery of the kharjas makes clear instead is that from its origins, the literature of Spain has arisen out of and born witness to a rich, heterogeneous mix of cultures and languages.

Cantar de Mio Cid

The epic poem Cantar de Mio Cid was written about a real man—his battles, conquests, and daily life. The poet, name unknown, wrote the epic in about 1140 and Cid supposedly died forty years before in 1099. This epic represents realism, because nothing was exaggerated and the details are very real, even the geography correctly portrays the areas in which Cid traveled and lived. Unlike other European epics, the poem is not idealized and there is no presence of supernatural beings. It has assonance instead of rhyme and its lines vary in length, the most common length being fourteen syllables. This type of verse is known as mester de juglaria (verse form of the minstrels). The epic is divided into three parts, also known as cantos.

Mester de Juglaría

Medieval Spanish poets recognized the Mester de Juglaría as a literary form written by the minstrels (juglares) and composed of varying line length and use of assonance instead of rhyme. These poems were sung to uneducated audiences, nobles and peasants alike.

Mester de Clerecía

This Castilian narrative poetry known as the Mester de Clerecía became popular in the thirteenth century. It is the verse form of the learned poets, usually clerics (hence the name 'clerecía'). These poets carefully counted the number of syllables in each line and strived to achieve perfect lines. The line form is the Alexandrine line (14 syllables) with consonantal rhyme in stanzas of four lines each. This form is also known as the cuaderna vía or the fourfold way, and was borrowed from France and was popular until the late fourteenth century. Popular themes of these poets were Christian legends, lives of saints, and tales from classical antiquity. The poems were cited to villagers in public plazas. Two traits separate this form from the mester de juglaría: didacticism and erudition. Castilian priest and poet Gonzalo de Berceo was one of the greatest followers of the mester de clerecía. All of his works were religious; two of the most well known are Milagros de Nuestra Señora (about the miracles worked by the Virgin Mary) and Vida de Santa Oria. Sem Tob de Carrión, a Jewish poet born towards the end of the thirteenth century, was very admired for his Proverbios Morales.  Fourteenth-century poet Juan Ruíz, also known as the Arcipreste de Hita, used the cuaderna vía in parts of his famous work Libro de buen amor. He introduced sixteen-syllable lines.

Spanish prose

Spanish prose gained popularity in the mid-thirteenth century when King Alfonso X el Sabio of Castilla gave support and recognition to the writing form. He, with the help of his groups of intellectuals, directed the composition of many prose works including Las siete partidas, the first modern book of laws of the land written in the people's language. Another work was La primera crónica general which accounted for the history of Spain from the creation until the end of Alfonso's father's reign, San Fernando. For his direction of these works and many others he directed, Alfonso X is called the father of Spanish prose. His nephew, Don Juan Manuel is famous for his prose work El Conde Lucanor which is a frame story or short stories within an overall story. In this work, the Conde Lucanor seeks advice from his wise counselor, Patronio, who gives the advice through the telling of stories. Juan Manuel also wrote lesser-known works such as El libro de los estados on the social classes and El libro del caballero y escudero on philosophical discussions. Toward the end of the Middle Ages, writer Hernando del Pulgar (1436-1490?) created a new type of prose named the verbal portrait. This form is demonstrated by Pulgar's work Claros varones de Castilla in which he represents the detailed lives of twenty-four distinguished contemporaries. He explores their moral and psychological natures as well as physical traits. Pulgar was the official historian of the monarchs Fernando and Isabel, the famous Catholic Monarchs of Spain. This position gave him close encounters with the characters in this book, making the work realistic and detailed.

Lyric poetry of the Middle Ages

Lyric poetry in the Middle Ages can be divided into three groups: the kharjas, the popular poems originating from folk-songs sung by commoners, and the courtly poetry of the nobles. Alfonso X el Sabio fits into the third group with his series of three hundred poems, written in Galician: Las cantigas de Santa María. Another poet, Juan Ruiz, or the Arcipreste de Hita is an outstanding lyricist of the fourteenth century. His only work, Libro de buen amor is a framework tale in which he includes translations from Ovid, satires, little poems called serranillas, twenty-nine fables, a sermon on Christian armor, and many lyric poems that praise the Virgin Mary. Poet Íñigo López de Mendoza, the Marqués de Santillana (1398–1458), begins to show the movement away from the traditions of the Middle Ages. He shows a knowledge of Latin authors and familiarity with the works of Dante and Petrarch. Mendoza was also the first to introduce the sonnet into Spanish literature. 

Another well-known medieval Spanish poet is Jorge Manrique. He is famous for his work which laments the death of his father, Coplas a la muerte de su padre. In this piece, Manrique shows classical feelings by expressing himself in a universal manner (all things come to an end). He is still considered a poet of the Middle Ages in that he finds peace and finality in religion.

Mystery plays

The Auto de los Reyes Magos is the oldest extant liturgical drama (12th century) written in Spanish language.  It is a codex found in the library of the Toledo Cathedral and is a mystery play belonging to the Christmas cycle. It is a play about the Biblical Magi, three wise men from the East who followed a star and visited the baby Jesus in Bethlehem.  It is believed to have been based on an earlier liturgical Latin play written in France.

The Misteri d'Elx (in English, the Elx Mystery Play or Mystery Play of Elx) is a liturgical drama dating from the Middle Ages, which is enacted and celebrated in the Basilica de Santa María in the city of Elx on 14 and 15 August of each year. In 2001, UNESCO declared it one of the Masterpieces of the Oral and Intangible Heritage of Humanity. It commemorates the Assumption of Mary.

Bibliographical reference 
 Alvar, Carlos, José-Carlos Mainer y Rosa Navarro, Breve historia de la literatura española, Alianza Editorial, Madrid, 2005.
 Cañas Murillo, Jesús, La poesía medieval: de las jarchas al Renacimiento, Anaya, Madrid, 1990.
 Deyermond, A. D., Historia de la literatura española, 1. La Edad Media, Ariel, Barcelona, 1989.
 Deyermond, Alan, Edad Media. Primer suplemento, vol. 1/1 de Francisco Rico, Historia y crítica de la literatura española, Crítica, Barcelona, 1991.
 Pedraza Jiménez, Felipe B. y Milagros Rodríguez Cáceres, Las épocas de la literatura española, Ariel, Barcelona, 2006.
 Rubio Tovar, Joaquín, La prosa medieval, Playor, Madrid, 1982.

References

External links 
 Brief literary history in donQuijote.org
 The medieval history through the texts
 Links about medieval Spanish literature
 Medieval Spanish poetry

Old Spanish literature
History of the Spanish language